The 2017 Games of the Small States of Europe, also known as the XVII Games of the Small States of Europe, took place in San Marino from 29 May to 3 June 2017.

Development and preparation

Venues

Games

Participating teams

  (49)
  (143)
  (136)
  (43)
  (150)
  (86)
  (99)
  (46)
  (host nation) (125)

Sports

 
 
 
 
 
 
 
 
 
 
 
 Volleyball (2)
  Beach volleyball (2)

Calendar
Source:

Medal table

Key:

References

External links
Official website

 
Games of the Small States of Europe
Games of the Small States of Europe
Games of the Small States of Europe
Multi-sport events in San Marino
Games of the Small States of Europe
Smalla
Games of the Small States of Europe
Games of the Small States of Europe